Michael Feliz (born June 28, 1993) is a Dominican professional baseball pitcher for the Leones de Yucatán of the Mexican League. He has played in Major League Baseball (MLB) for the Houston Astros, Pittsburgh Pirates, Cincinnati Reds, Boston Red Sox, and Oakland Athletics.

Career

Houston Astros
Feliz signed with the Houston Astros as an international free agent in May 2010. In 2014, he played in the All-Star Futures Game.

Feliz made his MLB debut with the Astros on May 31, 2015. In five relief appearances with the 2015 Astros, he had a 7.88 earned run average (ERA) and struck out seven batters in eight innings pitched.

During spring training in 2016, Feliz beat out James Hoyt for the final spot on the Astros' Opening Day roster. After throwing 107 pitches in relief during the second game of the season, he was optioned back to the minors the next day. On April 25, he was promoted back to the major leagues. Overall with the 2016 Astros, Feliz appeared in 47 MLB games, all in relief, compiling an 8–1 win–loss record with 4.43 ERA while recording 95 strikeouts in 65 innings.

In 2017, Feliz made 46 relief appearances and finished with a 4–2 record and a 5.63 ERA. He was not on the team's postseason roster, as the Astros went on to win the 2017 World Series.

Overall in parts of three seasons with Houston, Feliz struck out 172 batters in 121 innings while compiling a 5.13 ERA in 98 appearances.

Pittsburgh Pirates
On January 13, 2018, the Astros traded Feliz, along with Joe Musgrove, Colin Moran and Jason Martin, to the Pittsburgh Pirates for Gerrit Cole. Feliz pitched exclusively out of the bullpen for the 2018 Pirates, appearing in 47 games while registering a 5.66 ERA and striking out 55 batters in  innings. In 2019, Feliz recorded an 3.99 ERA while compiling a 4–4 record with 73 strikeouts in  innings, across 57 relief appearances and one start. In the pandemic-shortened 2020 season, Feliz only appeared in three games, allowing six runs on four hits in  innings of work before missing the remainder of the season due to a forearm/elbow strain. In 2021, Feliz recorded a 2.35 ERA in seven games for the Pirates before being designated for assignment on May 9.

Overall in parts of four seasons with the Pirates, Feliz appeared in 115 MLB games while recording 138 strikeouts in  innings with a 5.00 ERA.

Cincinnati Reds
On May 14, 2021, Feliz was claimed off waivers by the Cincinnati Reds. In nine appearances for the Reds, Feliz struggled to a 16.20 ERA with nine strikeouts. On June 4, Feliz earned the first save of his major league career, against the St. Louis Cardinals. On August 23, Feliz was designated for assignment by the Reds. On August 25, Feliz was placed on release waivers by the Reds.

Boston Red Sox
On August 28, 2021, Feliz was signed to a minor-league contract by the Boston Red Sox, who assigned him to the Triple-A Worcester Red Sox. Feliz was added to Boston's active roster on September 6. After making four relief appearances with the Red Sox, Feliz was designated for assignment on September 17.

Oakland Athletics
On September 20, 2021, Feliz was claimed off of waivers by the Oakland Athletics. He recorded one out in his lone appearance for Oakland, without allowing a run. Feliz was designated for assignment by Oakland on September 27. On October 1, he was released by the Athletics.

Overall during 2021, Feliz appeared in 21 MLB games for four different teams, posting a 7.20 ERA while recording 22 strikeouts in 20 innings.

Boston Red Sox (second stint)
On December 1, 2021, the Red Sox signed Feliz to a minor-league deal, with an invitation to spring training. He began the season with Triple-A Worcester and was added to Boston's major league roster on July 7, 2022. He made one relief appearance for the team and was designated for assignment on July 9. Feliz then declined a minor-league assignment, electing to become a free agent.

Minnesota Twins
On July 23, 2022, Feliz signed a minor-league contract with the Minnesota Twins. Feliz made 18 appearances for the Triple-A St. Paul Saints, logging a 3-1 record and 2.19 ERA with 24 strikeouts in 24.2 innings pitched. He elected free agency on November 10, 2022.

Leones de Yucatán
On February 27, 2023, Feliz signed with the Leones de Yucatán of the Mexican League.

References

External links

1993 births
Living people
People from Azua Province
Dominican Republic expatriate baseball players in the United States
Major League Baseball pitchers
Major League Baseball players from the Dominican Republic
Boston Red Sox players
Cincinnati Reds players
Houston Astros players
Oakland Athletics players
Pittsburgh Pirates players
Corpus Christi Hooks players
Dayton Dragons players
Dominican Summer League Astros players
Fresno Grizzlies players
Greeneville Astros players
Gulf Coast Astros players
Indianapolis Indians players
Lancaster JetHawks players
Louisville Bats players
Quad Cities River Bandits players
Tri-City ValleyCats players
Worcester Red Sox players
Tigres del Licey players